Juho Kautto (born 23 July 1971 in Äänekoski) is a Finnish politician currently serving in the Parliament of Finland for the Left Alliance at the Central Finland constituency. He was first elected to office in 2019. 

Kautto was also the speaker of the Äänekoski city council until April 2021, when he stepped down from this position after having been caught chairing a city council meeting whilst drunk the previous month.

References

1971 births
Living people
People from Äänekoski
Left Alliance (Finland) politicians
Members of the Parliament of Finland (2019–23)